Apatelodes tropea is a moth in the family Apatelodidae. It is found in Brazil.

The wingspan is about 28 mm. The forewings are grey with a broad basal transverse angular brown band and an outer band on the inner side, followed by a very fine angular subterminal line. The hindwings are light brown.

References

Natural History Museum Lepidoptera generic names catalog

Apatelodidae
Moths described in 1896